Lou de Laâge (born 27 April 1990) is a French actress. She has been nominated for two César Awards—the French equivalent to the Oscars—for her performances in the independent film Jappeloup (2013) and the drama film Respire (2014).

Life and career
She was born in Bordeaux. After receiving her Baccalaureate, she moved to Paris and attended the Ecole Claude Mathieu for three years.

She started her career as a model where she appeared in a commercial campaign for the cosmetics brand Bourjois in 2009. Shortly after, she started acting in television productions, followed by films and plays.

She was awarded the Prix Romy Schneider in 2016.

Filmography

Theatre
Il était une fois... le Petit Poucet (Gérard Gelas, 2013)
Entrez et fermez la porte (Raphaële Billetdoux, Théâtre Essaïon, 2013)

References

External links 

 

1990 births
Living people
French film actresses
21st-century French actresses
Actresses from Bordeaux
French stage actresses
French television actresses
International Emmy Award for Best Actress winners